George Somerset Finch (1794 – 29 June 1870), of Burley-on-the-Hill, Rutland, was a British landowner and politician.

Background
Finch was the illegitimate son of George Finch, 9th Earl of Winchilsea and Mrs Phoebe Thompson and was educated at Harrow School (1805–11), Trinity College, Cambridge (1811) and the Middle Temple (1817). In 1808 he was granted a licence to use the Finch arms. On his father's death in 1826 he inherited substantial estates, including Burley House near Oakham, Rutland and a large fortune.

Political career
Finch sat as Member of Parliament for Lymington between 1820 and 1821, for Stamford between 1832 and 1837 and for Rutland between 1846 and 1847.

He was High Sheriff of Rutland for 1829–30.

Family
Finch was twice married. He married firstly, Jane, daughter of Vice-Admiral John Richard Delap, in 1819. After her early death in 1821 he married secondly Lady Louisa, daughter of Henry Somerset, 6th Duke of Beaufort, in 1832, with whom he had 2 sons and 2 daughters.

Finch died in June 1870. Lady Louisa survived him by over twenty years and died in August 1892. Burley House passed to his son George, who was also a politician.

See also
Earl of Winchilsea and Nottingham

References

External links 
 

1794 births
1870 deaths
People from Burley, Rutland
People educated at Harrow School
Alumni of Trinity College, Cambridge
Members of the Middle Temple
High Sheriffs of Rutland
Members of the Parliament of the United Kingdom for English constituencies
UK MPs 1820–1826
UK MPs 1832–1835
UK MPs 1835–1837
UK MPs 1841–1847
George